Joppa (a latinization of the 4th century Greek name, Ἰόππη) appears in the Bible as the name of the Israeli city of Jaffa. 

Joppa may also refer to:

Places

United Kingdom 
Joppa, Edinburgh, in the eastern suburbs of Edinburgh, Scotland
Joppa, Ayrshire, on the outskirts of Ayr, Scotland
Joppa, Cornwall, a location in Cornwall, England
Joppa, Wales, a hamlet in Ceredigion, Wales

United States 
Joppa, Alabama
Joppa, Illinois
Joppa, Indiana
Joppa, Kentucky
Joppa, Maryland
Joppa Road
Joppa, Tennessee, in the Great Smoky Mountains foothills of Grainger County
Joppa, Texas
Joppa, West Virginia

Australia 
Joppa Junction is a junction on the Sydney–Melbourne railway line near Yarra railway station.

See also
Joppe (disambiguation)